Morrison-Mott House is a historic home located at Statesville, Iredell County, North Carolina.  The house was built about 1904–1905, and is a two-story, three bay, Classical Revival style frame dwelling.  It features a two-story, center bay portico, one-story Ionic order wraparound porch, and porte-cochère.

It was added to the National Register of Historic Places in 1980.

References

Houses on the National Register of Historic Places in North Carolina
Neoclassical architecture in North Carolina
Houses completed in 1905
Houses in Iredell County, North Carolina
National Register of Historic Places in Iredell County, North Carolina
1905 establishments in North Carolina